Roses of Picardy is a 1927 British silent war film directed by Maurice Elvey and starring Lillian Hall-Davis, John Stuart and Humberston Wright. The title is a reference to the popular First World War song Roses of Picardy. It was based on the novels The Spanish Farm (1924) Sixty-Four, Ninety-Four (1925) by R.H. Mottram. It was made at the Cricklewood Studios in London.

Cast
 Lillian Hall-Davis - Madame Vanderlynden 
 John Stuart - Lieutenant Skene 
 Humberston Wright - Jerome Vanderlynden 
 Jameson Thomas - Georges d'Archeville 
 Marie Ault - Baroness d'Archeville 
 A. Bromley Davenport - Baron d'Archeville 
 Clifford Heatherley - Uncle

References

Bibliography
 Low, Rachel. The History of British Film: Volume IV, 1918–1929. Routledge, 1997.

External links

1927 films
British war films
British silent feature films
1927 war films
1920s English-language films
Films directed by Maurice Elvey
British World War I films
Films set in the 1910s
Films set in France
Films shot at Cricklewood Studios
British black-and-white films
Films produced by Victor Saville
Films based on multiple works
1920s British films